Daddy's Little Girl is the only studio album by American rapper Nikki D. It was released on September 3, 1991 through Def Jam Recordings. Recording sessions took place at Power Play Studios, Chung King Studios, Greene St. Recording, Libra Digital Sound, Marathon Studios and Island Media Studios in New York. Production was handled by S.I.D. Reynolds, Leaders of the New School, The Epitome of Scratch, Eric "Vietnam" Sadler, Smooth Ice, Prince Paul and Sam Sever. The album reached number 54 on the US Billboard Top R&B/Hip-Hop Albums; while its eponymous lead single reached No. 10 on the Hot Dance Singles Sales and No. 1 on the Hot Rap Singles. 

The album is notable for being Def Jam's first rap album released by a female.

Track listing

Personnel

Nichelle "Nikki D" Strong – vocals
Sidney "S.I.D." Reynolds – producer (tracks: 1, 3, 9, 10), mixing (tracks: 3, 9, 10)
Bryan "Charlie Brown" Higgins – producer (tracks: 2, 4, 6)
James "Dinco D" Jackson – producer (tracks: 2, 4, 6)
Sheldon "Cut Monitor Milo" Scott – producer (tracks: 2, 4, 6)
Trevor "Busta Rhymes" Smith – producer (tracks: 2, 4, 6)
Robert "Epitome" Taylor – producer (track 5), co-producer (track 7)
Eric "Vietnam" Sadler – producer (track 7)
Arthur "Smooth Ice" Robinson – producer (tracks: 8, 11)
"Prince Paul" Huston – producer (track 12)
Sam "Sever" Citrin – producer (track 13)
Camille Gainer – co-producer (track 11)
Russell Simmons – executive producer
Anton Pukshansky – recording (tracks: 1, 3)
Steve Greenwell – recording & mixing (tracks: 2, 4, 6)
Josh Chervokas – mixing (track 1)
Kevin Reynolds – mixing (tracks: 3, 9, 10)
Charles Dos Santos – recording & mixing (track 5)
Chris Shaw – recording & mixing (tracks: 5, 7)
Michael Mangini – recording & mixing (track 6)
Paul "Large Professor" Mitchell – post-production & re-mixing (track 8)
Chris Champion – re-mixing (track 8)
Tony Aliprantis – recording (tracks: 9, 10)
Tony Papamichael – recording (tracks: 9, 10)
Christopher Savino – recording (track 11)
Ted Sabety – mixing (track 11)
Mike Teelucksingh – recording & mixing (track 12)
Joe Grant – photography
Faith Newman – A&R

Charts

References

External links

1991 debut albums
Columbia Records albums
Def Jam Recordings albums
Albums recorded at Chung King Studios
Albums recorded at Greene St. Recording
Albums produced by Prince Paul (producer)